= Small cajal body-specific rna 26a =

Non-coding RNA in the species Homo sapiens

SCARNA26A

Identifiers
- Aliases: SCARNA26A, small Cajal body-specific RNA 26A
- External IDs: GeneCards: SCARNA26A; OMA:SCARNA26A - orthologs
Orthologs
Species	Human	Mouse
Entrez	106633810	n/a
Ensembl	n/a	n/a
UniProt	n a	n/a
RefSeq (mRNA)	n/a	n/a
RefSeq (protein)	n/a	n/a
Location (UCSC)	n/a	n/a
PubMed search		n/a
- Wikidata
View/Edit Human

Small Cajal body-specific RNA 26A is a protein that in humans is encoded by the SCARNA26A gene.
